Morris Owens (born February 14, 1953 in Oakland, California), is a former professional American football player who was the Tampa Bay Buccaneers leading receiver in 1976, their first season in the National Football League. He is also Hilly Hicks' uncle.

1953 births
Living people
Players of American football from Oakland, California
American football wide receivers
Arizona State Sun Devils football players
Miami Dolphins players
Tampa Bay Buccaneers players